Sami Khan is a Pakistani child actor. He is known for his role as DJ (Jiya's younger brother) in Suno Chanda for which he received Hum Awards for Best Child Actor. In 2019, Khan appeared in film Heer Maan Ja.

Career
Sami has appeared in several advertisements and television serials. He got recognition after his appearance as DJ in 2018 critically acclaimed TV series Suno Chanda and later on reprised his role in sequel Suno Chanda 2. His other appearances include Woh Aik Pal and Tum Kon Piya. In 2019, he appeared in sitcom Dolly Darling and film Heer Maan Ja co-featuring Hareem Farooq and Ali Rehman Khan.

Filmography

Television

Film

References

External links

Pakistani male child actors
People from Karachi
Living people
Year of birth missing (living people)